Eibos was a town of ancient Phrygia, inhabited in Roman and Byzantine times. 

Its site is located near Payamalan in Asiatic Turkey.

References

Populated places in Phrygia
Former populated places in Turkey
Roman towns and cities in Turkey
Populated places of the Byzantine Empire
History of Uşak Province
Sivaslı District